Gia Marie Carangi (January 29, 1960November 18, 1986) was an American model, considered by many to be the first supermodel. She was featured on the cover of many magazines, including multiple editions of Vogue and Cosmopolitan, and appeared in advertising campaigns for luxury fashion houses such as Armani, Dior, Versace and Yves Saint Laurent.

After Carangi became addicted to heroin, her career rapidly declined. In 1986, at age 26, she died of AIDS-related complications. Believed to have contracted it from a contaminated needle, she became one of the first famous women to die of the disease. Her life was dramatized in the 1998 HBO television film Gia, directed by Michael Cristofer and starring Angelina Jolie as Carangi.

Early life and education

Carangi was born on January 29, 1960, in Philadelphia, the third and youngest child of Joseph Carangi, a restaurant owner, and Kathleen Carangi (née Adams), a homemaker. She had two older brothers. Her father was Italian, and her mother was of Irish and Welsh ancestry. Joseph and Kathleen had an unstable, violent marriage, ultimately leading Kathleen to abandon the family when Carangi was eleven years old.  Gia was described as "needy and manipulative" by relatives who recalled her as spoiled and shy as a child and a "mommy's girl" who did not receive the motherly attention that she desired. Those who knew Gia blamed her "fractured childhood" for the instability and drug dependence that plagued her adult life.

In her adolescent years, Carangi found the attention she sought from other teenage girls, befriending them by sending flowers. While attending Abraham Lincoln High School, Carangi bonded with "the Bowie kids", a group of obsessive David Bowie fans who emulated Bowie's "defiantly weird, high-glam" style. Carangi was drawn to Bowie for his fashion preferences and his ambiguous gender play and outspoken bisexuality. One of Carangi's friends later spoke of her "tomboy persona", describing her relaxed openness about her sexuality as reminiscent of the character Cay in the 1985 film Desert Hearts. Carangi and her "bi-try Bowie-mad" friends hung out in Philadelphia's gay clubs and bars. Though she associated with the lesbian community, she did not want to take up "the accepted lesbian style."

Career
After being featured in Philadelphia newspaper ads and being discovered by Sondra Scerca in Maurice Tannenbaum's hair salon, Carangi moved to New York City at the age of 17, where she signed with Wilhelmina Models. Her first major shoot, published in October 1978, was with top fashion photographer Chris von Wangenheim, who had her pose nude behind a chain-link fence with makeup artist Sandy Linter. Carangi immediately became infatuated with Linter and pursued her, though the relationship never became stable. By the end of 1978, her first year in New York, Carangi was already a well-established model. Of her quick rise to prominence, described by Vogue as "meteoric", Carangi later said, "I started working with very good people, I mean all the time, very fast. I didn't build into a model, I just sort of became one."

Carangi was a favorite model of various fashion photographers, including Von Wangenheim, Francesco Scavullo, Arthur Elgort, Richard Avedon, and Denis Piel. Well-integrated within the fashion world, she had the selection of several photographers, most notably Scavullo. Carangi was featured on the cover of many fashion magazines, including the April 1979 issue of British Vogue, the April 1979 and August 1980 issues of Vogue Paris, the August 1980 issue of American Vogue, the February 1981 issue of Vogue Italia, and multiple issues of Cosmopolitan between 1979 and 1982. During these years, she also appeared in various advertising campaigns for high-profile fashion houses, including Armani, André Laug, Christian Dior, Versace, and Yves Saint Laurent. At the height of her career, Carangi was most known in modeling circles by only her first name. During this time, she also appeared in the Blondie music video for "Atomic".

A regular at Studio 54 and the Mudd Club, Carangi usually used cocaine in clubs. After her agent, mentor, and friend Wilhelmina Cooper, died of lung cancer in March 1980, a devastated Carangi began using drugs and developed an addiction to heroin. Carangi's addiction soon began to affect her work; she had violent temper tantrums, walked out of photo shoots to buy drugs, and fell asleep in front of the camera. Scavullo recalled a fashion shoot with Carangi in the Caribbean when "she was crying, she couldn't find her drugs. I literally had to lay her down on her bed until she fell asleep." During one of her final location shoots for American Vogue, Carangi had red bumps in the crooks of her elbows where she had injected heroin. Despite airbrushing, some of the photos, as published in the November 1980 issue, reportedly still showed visible needle marks.

In November 1980, Carangi left Wilhelmina Models and signed with Ford Models, but she was dropped within weeks. By then, her career was in a steep decline. Modeling offers soon ceased and her fashion industry friends, including Sandy Linter, refused to speak to her, fearing their association with her would harm their careers.  In an attempt to quit using drugs, she moved back to Philadelphia with her mother and stepfather in February 1981. Carangi underwent a 21-day detox program, but her sobriety was short-lived. She was arrested in March 1981 after she drove into a fence in a suburban neighborhood. After a chase with police, she was taken into custody where it was later determined she was under the influence of alcohol and cocaine. After her release, Carangi briefly signed with a new agency, Legends, and worked sporadically, mainly in Europe.

In late 1981, although still using drugs, Carangi was determined to make a comeback in the fashion industry and signed with Elite Model Management.  While some clients refused to work with her, others were willing to hire her because of her past status as a top model. Scavullo photographed her for the April 1982 cover of Cosmopolitan, her last cover appearance for an American magazine. Sean Byrnes, Scavullo's long-time assistant, later said, "What she was doing to herself finally became apparent in her pictures. ... I could see the change in her beauty. There was an emptiness in her eyes."

Carangi then mainly worked with photographer Albert Watson and found work modeling for department stores and catalogs. She appeared in an advertising campaign for Versace, shot by Richard Avedon. He hired her for the fashion house's next campaign, but during the photo shoot, in late 1982, Carangi became uncomfortable and left before any useable shots of her were taken. Around this time, Carangi enrolled in an outpatient methadone program but soon began using heroin again. By the end of 1982, she had only a few clients that were willing to hire her. Carangi's final photo shoot was for German mail-order clothing company Otto GmbH in Tunisia; she was sent home during the shoot for using heroin. She left New York for the final time in early 1983.

Death
Carangi spent most of her modeling earnings on drugs, and spent the final three years of her life with various lovers, friends, and family members in Philadelphia and Atlantic City. She was admitted to an intense drug treatment program at Eagleville Hospital in December 1984. After treatment, she got a job in a clothing store, which she eventually quit. She later found employment as a checkout clerk and then worked in the cafeteria of a nursing home. By late 1985, she had begun using drugs again and was engaging in sex work in Atlantic City.

In December 1985, Carangi was admitted to Warminster General Hospital in Warminster, Pennsylvania, with bilateral pneumonia. A few days later, she was diagnosed with AIDS-related complex. In the fall of 1986, Carangi was hospitalized again, after being found on the street badly beaten and raped.  On October 18, she was admitted to Hahnemann University Hospital in Center City Philadelphia. Carangi died at the Hahnemann Hospital of AIDS-related complications one month later, on November 18, 1986, at the age of 26, becoming one of the first famous women to die of the disease. Her funeral was held on November 23 at a small funeral home in Philadelphia. No one from the fashion world attended. However, weeks later, Francesco Scavullo, Carangi's friend and confidant, sent a Mass card when he heard the news.

Legacy
Carangi is often considered to be the first supermodel, although that title has been applied to others, including Margaux Hemingway, 
Audrey Munson, Lisa Fonssagrives, Dorian Leigh, Twiggy, Jean Shrimpton, and Janice Dickinson. Model Cindy Crawford, who rose to prominence the year Carangi died, was referred to as "Baby Gia" because of her resemblance to Carangi. Crawford later recalled, "My agents took me to all the photographers who liked Gia: Albert Watson, Francesco Scavullo, Bill King. Everyone loved her look so much that they gladly saw me." Additionally, Carangi, whose sexual orientation has been reported as either lesbian or bisexual, is considered a lesbian icon and is said to have "epitomized lesbian chic more than a decade before the term was coined." Argentine model Mica Argañaraz has often been compared to Carangi, whom she considers a beauty icon.

Carangi's life has been the subject of several works. A biography of Carangi by Stephen Fried titled Thing of Beauty—taken from the first line of John Keats' famous poem Endymion—was published in 1993. Gia, a biographical television film starring Angelina Jolie, debuted on HBO in 1998. Jolie won a Golden Globe Award and a Screen Actors Guild Award for her performance, among other accolades. A documentary titled The Self-Destruction of Gia, released in 2003, showcased footage of Carangi, contemporary interviews with Carangi's family and former colleagues, including Sandy Linter, and footage of actress-screenwriter Zoë Lund, herself a heroin addict, who had been commissioned to write a screenplay based upon Carangi's life at the time of her own death of drug-related causes in 1999.

A biography of Carangi by Sacha Lanvin Baumann titled Born This Way: Friends, Colleagues, and Coworkers Recall Gia Carangi, the Supermodel Who Defined an Era, was published in 2015. Sondra Scerca, who brought Carangi to Wilhelmina, is currently writing a memoir titled GIA, WILLY and ME, which will be released in 2022.
The AIDS Memorial Quilt contains one panel with Carangi's full name on it that only commemorates her, one panel that refers to her as Gia that only commemorates her, and one panel that refers to her as Gia and commemorates other people as well as her.

Designers and brands represented
 Armani
 Bloomingdale's
 Citicorp
 Cutex
 Christian Dior
 Perry Ellis
 Diane von Fürstenberg
 Lancetti
 Levi's
 Maybelline
 Yves Saint Laurent
 Versace
 Vidal Sassoon

References

External links

 
 
 

1960 births
1986 deaths
American female models
American people of Irish descent
American people of Italian descent
American people of Welsh descent
Female models from Philadelphia
LGBT models
LGBT people from Pennsylvania
People from Philadelphia
20th-century American women
AIDS-related deaths in Pennsylvania
Burials in Pennsylvania
20th-century American LGBT people